Sultan Ismail Hospital is a hospital in Taman Mount Austin, Johor Bahru, Johor, Malaysia. The hospital is named in honour of Sultan Ismail of Johor. 

The hospital was equipped with a computerised system and all administrative work and transactions would go through the system.

History
In July 2004, part of the hospital was opened but it closed down two months later due to the presence of fungal infection detected in the hospital. It was reopened in February 2006, but in April 2007 structural defects were found which involved replacing parts of the roof.

Since 2007, it has been serving the community in a modern facility, equipped to meet the needs of the ageing population. 

It is also now utilised by Newcastle University Medicine Malaysia (NUMed Malaysia) as one of their primary teaching hospitals, with NUMeds own team of doctors working alongside the local hospital team.

Architecture
The hospital was constructed with a cost of MYR500 million.

Transportation
The hospital is accessible by Muafakat Bus route P-106 and Shuttle HSI bus.

See also
 List of hospitals in Malaysia

References

External links
 Hospital Sultan Ismail Official Website
 MOH Hospitals List

2004 establishments in Malaysia
Buildings and structures in Johor Bahru
Hospitals established in 2004
Hospital buildings completed in 2004
Hospitals in Johor